Richard Maunier (born 8 December 1977 in Fort-de-France, Martinique) is a French athlete who specialises in the 400 meters. Maunier competed at the 2008 Summer Olympics.

References

External links
  Richard Maunier at sports-reference.com

1977 births
Living people
Sportspeople from Fort-de-France
Martiniquais athletes
French male sprinters
Olympic athletes of France
French people of Martiniquais descent
Athletes (track and field) at the 2008 Summer Olympics
Mediterranean Games silver medalists for France
Mediterranean Games medalists in athletics
Athletes (track and field) at the 2005 Mediterranean Games